A Special Lady is a 2017 South Korean crime action film directed by Lee An-gyu, starring Kim Hye-soo, Lee Sun-kyun and Lee Hee-joon.

Plot
The story concerns a woman who becomes the second-in-command of a gangster organization-turned-leading business entity, fighting against the ruthless world of man's society, to protect her only son.

Cast
Kim Hye-soo as Na Hyun-jung 
Lee Sun-kyun as Im Sang-hoon 
Lee Hee-joon as Choi Dae-sik
Choi Moo-sung as Chairman Kim
Kim Min-seok as Joo-hwan
Oh Ha-nee as Wei 
Han So-young as Kim Yeo-sa 
Cha Soon-bae as President Jang
Guk Joong-woong as President Kim
Kwon Yul as Gong-myeong (Cameo)

Production 
Filming began on January 28, 2016, and ended on April 28, 2016.

The film's early working title was Precious Woman.

Awards and nominations

References

External links

A Special Lady at Daum 
A Special Lady at Naver Movies 

2017 films
2017 crime action films
South Korean crime action films
2010s South Korean films